Kip Simons is a retired American gymnast.  Simons competed in the 1996 Olympics and the 1994 and 1995 World Championships.

Simons competed for Ohio State University.  In 1994, his senior year, Simons won the Nissen Award, the "Heisman" of men's gymnastics.  Simons credited a hard summer of training between his junior and senior years as propelling him to the next level.

Simons has been the gymnastics head coach at the United States Air Force Academy since 2005.  He was an assistant coach at the University of California, Berkeley from 2001 to 2005.

References

Year of birth missing (living people)
Living people
American male artistic gymnasts
United States Air Force Academy
Ohio State University people
Olympic gymnasts of the United States
Gymnasts at the 1996 Summer Olympics
Pan American Games medalists in gymnastics
Pan American Games gold medalists for the United States
Gymnasts at the 1995 Pan American Games